The 3rd Asian Junior Table Tennis Championships 1997 were held in Nagoya, Japan, from  1 to 6 April 1986. It was organised by the Japan Table Tennis Association under the authority of the Asian Table Tennis Union (ATTU) and International Table Tennis Federation (ITTF).

Medal summary

Events

Medal table

See also

Asian Table Tennis Championships
Asian Table Tennis Union

References

Asian Junior and Cadet Table Tennis Championships
Asian Junior and Cadet Table Tennis Championships
Asian Junior and Cadet Table Tennis Championships
Asian Junior and Cadet Table Tennis Championships
Table tennis competitions in Japan
International sports competitions hosted by Japan
Asian Junior and Cadet Table Tennis Championships